Rashtrabadi Milan Kendra Nepal Dal is a political party in Nepal. The party is registered with the Election Commission of Nepal ahead of the 2008 Constituent Assembly Election.

References

Political parties in Nepal